The 2006 FIBA Europe Under-18 Championship was an international basketball  competition held in Greece in 2006.

Final ranking
1.  France

2.  Lithuania

3.  Spain

4.  Turkey

5. 

6.  Greece

7.  Italy

8.  Bulgaria

9.  Russia

10.  Croatia

11.  Israel

12.  Latvia

13.  Germany

14.  Slovenia

15.  Iceland

16.  Ukraine

Awards

External links
FIBA Archive

FIBA U18 European Championship
2006–07 in European basketball
2006–07 in Greek basketball
International youth basketball competitions hosted by Greece